Vester Torup is a village in North Jutland, Denmark. It is located in Jammerbugt Municipality.

Notable residents 
 Henriette Nielsen (1815 — 1900), author

References

Cities and towns in the North Jutland Region
Jammerbugt Municipality
Villages in Denmark